Pogost is a rural locality (a settlement) and the administrative center of Sudromskoye Rural Settlement of Velsky District, Arkhangelsk Oblast, Russia. The population was 465 as of 2014. There are 3 streets.

Geography 
Pogost is located on the Vaga River, 34 km northeast of Velsk (the district's administrative centre) by road. Paytovskaya is the nearest rural locality.

References 

Rural localities in Velsky District